Samuel Florent Thomas Gigot (born 12 October 1993) is a French professional footballer who plays as a centre-back for Ligue 1 club Marseille. He is the brother of professional rugby league footballer Tony Gigot.

Career 
Gigot is a youth product of Arles-Avignon. He made his Ligue 2 debut on 30 August 2013 in a match against Niort. On 15 August 2014, he scored his first league goal against Nancy.

On 4 June 2018, Gigot signed a four-year contract with Russian club Spartak Moscow, where he later became notable for his passion, and, despite being a defender, his willingness to join attacks.  On 19 August 2019, he scored two goals in a 2–1 win over CSKA Moscow in the Main Moscow derby.

On 29 January 2022, Gigot signed for Ligue 1 club Marseille; he was loaned back to Spartak Moscow for the rest of the 2021–22 season. On 19 March 2022, he marked his 100th appearance for Spartak in all competitions during a 1–1 tie against FC Nizhny Novgorod. His last match for the team was a highly emotional 2–1 win over Dynamo Moscow on 29 May 2022 in the Russian Cup final.

His debut for Marseille in Ligue 1 was on 7 August 2022, when he started in a 4–1 victory over Reims. Gigot scored his first goal for the club in a 2–1 victory over LOSC Lille on 10 September 2022.

Personal life
Gigot was born to a French family in Avignon. He was rumoured to be of Algerian descent through his mother, however he denied the information and said he has no links to Algeria. His brother Tony is a professional rugby league footballer.

Honours
Spartak Moscow
Russian Cup: 2021–22

Career statistics

References

External links
 

1993 births
Sportspeople from Avignon
Living people
French footballers
Association football midfielders
AC Arlésien players
K.V. Kortrijk players
K.A.A. Gent players
FC Spartak Moscow players
Olympique de Marseille players
Ligue 2 players
Championnat National 3 players
Belgian Pro League players
Russian Premier League players
French expatriate footballers
French expatriate sportspeople in Belgium
Expatriate footballers in Belgium
French expatriate sportspeople in Russia
Expatriate footballers in Russia
Footballers from Provence-Alpes-Côte d'Azur